Jamnalal Bajaj Institute of Management Studies is the Department of Management Studies of the University of Mumbai. The institute is named after industrialist and philanthropist, Jamnalal Bajaj.

Programmes
JBIMS offers full-time Masters in Management Studies programme. In addition to MMS, the institute offers full-time course of Masters in Finance (MSc Finance), Master in Human Resource Development Management (MHRD),part-time courses and a doctoral PhD programme. In addition to the regular academics, guest lectures are organised from time to time.

Masters in Management Studies (MMS) 
Masters in Management Studies is the flagship course of Jamnalal Bajaj Institute of Management Studies. It is a two-year full-time post-graduate degree course in management. Started as early as 1965, the institute offers specializations in the second year of the MMS course. The title of the programme as MMS, instead of the usual MBA, is to emphasise that the principles and practices of management studies are applicable to all types of organisation and not only to business organisations.

Students can specialize in:
Finance
Marketing
Personnel (HR)
Operations
Systems

Masters in Finance (MSc Finance)

Started in 2013, on the recommendations of the Prime Minister's Office, the course was started as the first master's degree in finance by a college in India.
 
The course is two-years full-time and covers a wide range of topics in Finance, Quantitative Studies, Economics among others.

Master of Business Administrations (Part-time)
JBIMS offers part-time courses that include:
Masters in Marketing Management
Masters in Finance Management
Masters in Information Management
Masters in Human Resource Development and Management

Master in Human Resource Development (MHRD)
The institute offers a 2-year full time master's degree program “Master in Human Resource Development (MHRD)”.  Areas of focus include Talent Attraction, Compensation Administration, Human Resource Management, Performance Management, Welfare and Industrial Relations and Labour laws, Human Resources Information Systems, Learning and Development.

Rankings
Jamnalal Bajaj Institute of Management Studies has been consistently ranked in the list of the top 10 business schools in India.

Economic Times has ranked it at No. 9 in India.

Notable alumni

Owing to the extensive list of its alumni who've reached top positions in various MNCs, JBIMS is also known as the 'CEO Factory'.
Uday Kotak, Founder, MD and CEO of Kotak Mahindra Bank
Ajay Piramal, chairman of Piramal Healthcare
Chanda Kochhar, Former MD & CEO, ICICI Bank, India
Harish Bhimani, Voice-Over Artist
Harish Manwani, Ex-Global COO, Unilever PLC, Senior Operating Partner, Blackstone,
Lalita D. Gupte, chairperson, ICICI Venture Funds Management Company
Mani Ratnam, Indian Filmmaker
Dhvani Desai, Animation Filmmaker
Nitin Paranjpe, CEO & MD, Hindustan Unilever Ltd.
Raja Krishnamoorthy, Indian Film & TV Director
 Sam Balsara, Founder, chairman and MD of Madison World
Satish Modh, Director of Vivekananda Education Society Institute of Management, Mumbai
Siddharth Roy Kapur, CEO of UTV Motion Pictures, 1997
Suresh Kumar, Assistant Commerce Secretary for Trade Promotion and Director-General of the U.S. Foreign Commercial Service
Vinita Bali, Ex-MD of Britannia Industries

References 

Affiliates of the University of Mumbai
Business schools in Mumbai
Educational institutions established in 1965
1965 establishments in Maharashtra